Ilya Mikhailovich Gribakin (born 1 February 2004) is a Russian football player who plays for FC Chertanovo Moscow on loan from PFC Krylia Sovetov Samara.

Club career
He made his debut in the Russian Football National League for FC Chertanovo Moscow on 6 March 2021 in a game against PFC Krylia Sovetov Samara.

On 5 February 2022, Gribakin moved to Krylia Sovetov Samara.

References

External links
 
 Profile by Russian Football National League

2004 births
Living people
Russian footballers
Russia youth international footballers
Association football midfielders
FC Chertanovo Moscow players
PFC Krylia Sovetov Samara players
Russian First League players
Russian Second League players